Helga Susanne Sanggaard Petersen (born December 7, 1959 in Roskilde) is a Danish sprint canoer who competed in the late 1980s. She finished seventh in the K-4 500 m event at the 1988 Summer Olympics in Seoul.

References
 Sports-reference.com profile

1959 births
Canoeists at the 1988 Summer Olympics
Danish female canoeists
Living people
Olympic canoeists of Denmark
People from Roskilde
Sportspeople from Region Zealand